Musikot is an urban municipality located in Gulmi District of Lumbini Province of Nepal.

The municipality is divided into total 9 wards.

On 10 March 2017 Government of Nepal announced 744 local level units as per the new constitution of Nepal 2015, Musikot municipality came into existence merging following former VDCs: Arlangkot, Paudi Amarahi, Musikot, Badagaun, Aanpchaur, Kurgha, Wami Taksar and some parts of Neta. The headquarters of the municipality are located at Wami Taksar.

Demographics
At the time of the 2011 Nepal census, 97.4% of the population in Musikot Municipality spoke Nepali, 1.4% Newar, 1.0% Gurung and 0.1% Magar as their first language; 0.1% spoke other languages.

In terms of ethnicity/caste, 24.1% were Hill Brahmin, 23.6% Chhetri, 12.7% Kami, 12.6% Magar, 8.6% Kumal, 5.5% Sarki, 4.1% Damai/Dholi, 2.1% Thakuri, 1.7% Sanyasi/Dasnami and 5.0% others.

In terms of religion, 97.5% were Hindu, 2.1% Buddhist, 0.2% Christian, 0.1% Muslim and 0.1% others.

References

External links
 official website

Populated places in Gulmi District
Municipalities in Lumbini Province
Nepal municipalities established in 2017